The Royal Order of Muhammad Ali (Nishan al-Muhammad'Ali) was an order of chivalry and state honour in the Kingdom of Egypt.

History
The Order of Muhammad Ali was founded by Sultan Hussein Kamel to commemorate the Muhammad Ali dynasty on 14 April 1915. It was discontinued on formation of the Arab Republic of Egypt on 18 June 1953.

This order was the first in rank among the Orders of the Kingdom of Egypt. It consisted of a "Collar" and a single class, the "Grand Cordon". It also included two Medals, one in gold, the other in silver.

"The Collar" was reserved for His Majesty the King, who may confer it on Members of His Family, Heads of State, Sovereigns and Princes Regnant and Members of their families;
"The Grand Cordon" could only be conferred for very special merit or for exceptional services to the Country. The Grand Cordons wore a plaque on the left side of the chest and, as a sash, from right to left, a broad green moiré ribbon edged with white, with the decoration of the Order attached to the end. The number of Grand Cordons was fixed at fifteen, excluding members of the Royal Family and foreigners who were not officials of the Egyptian State. The Grand Cordons residing in Egypt received their insignia from His Majesty the King. They were also given a patent bearing the Royal Seals. Grand Cordons received military honours on their death.
"The Medals of the Order of Mohamed Ali", "in gold and silver", were intended solely to reward brilliant actions accomplished by soldiers and sailors without distinction of rank or grade. The medal was worn on the left side of the chest suspended by a ribbon in the colours of the Order. After the death of the holder, the medals and certificates remained the property of his family.

Contemporary period
Although the Order of Mohamed Ali was abrogated by the Egyptian Republic, it is still awarded on rare occasions as a dynastic order by the former King Fouad II.

References

Muhammad Ali
Awards established in 1915
1915 establishments in Egypt
1953 disestablishments in Egypt